Leptomyrina phidias is a butterfly in the family Lycaenidae. It is found on Madagascar and Réunion. The habitat consists of rocky areas with rupicolous vegetation (growing on rocks) and anthropogenic environments.

The larvae feed on Bryophyllum species including B. delagoense, B. daigremontianum, B. proliferum and B. pinnatum.

References

Butterflies described in 1793
Hypolycaenini
Lepidoptera of Madagascar
Lepidoptera of Réunion